Association football, known more popularly as football, is considered the national sport of Singapore. The country is home to the Football Association of Singapore (FAS), the oldest football association in Asia with its roots coming from The Football Association in England. The national teams include the men's, women's and youth. Despite the country having a relatively small population pool, it has generally punched above its weight by successively producing squads that has fiercely competed with much larger and more populated countries in both club and international football.

The sport reached one of its highest peaks during the 1980s and 1990s with the Singapore Lions' participation in the Malaysia Cup, whereby they dominated the competition. The Singapore Lions, the team which played in the Malaysia Cup, is not considered as a national team. The Singapore Lions left the Malaysia Cup in 1994, before rejoining the competition in 2012 as the LionsXII until 2015, winning a league title in 2013 and an FA Cup in 2015 in the process.

The men's senior team is one of the strongest national sides in Southeast Asia, being the second most successful team in the AFF Championship with 4 titles, winning in 1998, 2004, 2007 and 2012. It is also one of the only two national teams in history to have won consecutive titles in the competition. The current champions of Singaporean club football is Lion City Sailors, having won the Singapore Premier League title in the 2021 season.

History
The first football match in Singapore were between two teams of British engineers in 1889. The Singapore Amateur Football Association (SAFA), under its current name Football Association of Singapore (FAS), was formed in 1892 by a group of British in colonial Singapore.

League system

Professional league
The Singapore Premier League is a professional league for men's football clubs in Singapore, governed by the Football Association of Singapore. The semi-professional FAS Premier League was replaced by the professional S.League in 1996 when Singapore FA left the Malaysia Cup in 1994, due to disputes with the Football Association of Malaysia. The league adopted its current name in 2018.

Although the SPL is the highest level of domestic football competition in Singapore, it fails to attract supporters, with the dwindling attendees to matches and television view ratings. The FAS has invited foreign clubs to participate in the league, in attempt to increase competitiveness and attract more fans. There is no promotion and relegation in the current Singapore football league system. The reserves team of the SPL clubs compete in the Prime League formed in 1997.

Since its inception in 1996, seven clubs have been crowned champions. Geylang United claim the first league title. Warriors FC hold the most with nine. In 2010, Étoile FC became the first foreign side to win the competition.

Singapore Football League

The Singapore Football League, or more commonly known as the SFL is a semi-professional competition organised for football clubs which are affiliated with the Football Association of Singapore. FAS which was previously known as the Singapore Amateur Football Association, SAFA. It was the premier football league of Singapore until the FAS premier league was formed in 1988. The history of NFL can be traced back to as early as the early 20th century.

Women's Premier League 

The Women's Premier League is an amateur league for women's football clubs in Singapore, governed by the FAS.

Goal 2010
Goal 2010 was an objective, set by then-Prime Minister Goh Chok Tong in 1998, for the Singapore national team to reach the 2010 FIFA World Cup finals in South Africa. However, the goal was not met.

Malaysia Cup

Joining the Malaysia Cup in 1921, known as the Malaya Cup at that time, Singapore were the champions of the inaugural competition. They would further succeed in getting 24 titles for themselves during their time in the competition from 1921 to 1994, a span of 74 years.

In this competition, and the Malaysia league, Singapore submitted a representative team, which operated like a football club more than a national football team. It was called the Singapore FA in the country's 74 years in Malaysian football. The competition helped bring the likes of Fandi Ahmad and Dollah Kassim, with the former being the only Singaporean to have played for European clubs – he played for FC Groningen and OFI Crete.

National teams

The Football Association of Singapore organises the men's, women's and youth national football teams. The men's senior team is the second most successful team in the AFF Championship with 4 titles, winning in 1998, 2004, 2007 and 2012. The youth team claim bronze in the football event of the inaugural Youth Olympic Games, and runners-up and second runners-up for the 23rd Lion City Cup.

Stadium

The former National Stadium was the home of the Singapore national team. The team moved to Jalan Besar Stadium after the former ground was demolished in 2011 for the multi-purpose sports complex Singapore Sports Hub. After its completion in 2014, the team concurrently uses both the new National Stadium and Jalan Besar Stadium as their home grounds.

See also
Football Association of Singapore
List of football clubs in Singapore
Singapore football league system

References